The 2010 UFL Draft was the second draft of the United Football League. The draft took place on Wednesday, June 2, beginning at 7 p.m. EDT. The draft was held over a period of 12 rounds during which each of the five UFL teams was allowed one pick per round, in reverse order of 2009 finish, with the expansion Omaha Nighthawks picking first and the champion Las Vegas Locomotives picking last in each round. In Rounds 7–12, the selection order rotated forward each round. During rounds one and two, each team had five minutes to make their selection of a player. During rounds three through twelve, each team had three minutes to make their selection of a player. The round-by-round results were announced via each team's official Twitter feed.

Players selected in the draft remain on each team's Reserve/Unsigned list until formally added to the roster by virtue of a negotiated contract.

Player selections

Round one

Round two

Round three

Round four

Round five

Round six

Round seven

Round eight

Round nine

Round ten

Round eleven

Round twelve

References

External links
 UFL-Football.com

United Football League (2009–2012) Draft
Draft
UFL Draft